Cosmisoma gratum is a species of beetle in the family Cerambycidae. It was described by Monné & Magno in 1988.

References

Cosmisoma
Beetles described in 1988